Nathan Neil Martin Peat (born 19 September 1982) is an English former professional footballer. He played for Hull City, Cambridge United, Lincoln City, York City, Harrogate Town, Gainsborough Trinity, North Ferriby United and Scarborough Athletic. He is currently manager of Brigg Town.

Career

Hull City
Born in Hull, Humberside, Peat started his career with hometown club Hull City in their youth system, and was a member of the first team squad from 1999 to 2005. He was offered his first professional contract in April 2002 and this was signed on 11 July. A proposed loan move to Harrogate Town of the Northern Premier League collapsed in October 2003 as Hull needed cover at left back. He played for Cambridge United from 2003 to 2004 on loan and for Lincoln City from 2004 to 2005 on loan. Peat was released by Hull City at the end of the 2004–05 season.

York City
After joining York City on trial, and playing in a pre-season friendly at Frickley Athletic in July 2005, the Conference National outfit expressed an interest in signing him. After playing in two more pre-season games against Hartlepool United and Ossett Town he signed for the club on 30 July. Peat signed a new deal at York in July 2006 after being offered a contract extension earlier that summer. On 25 August, Peat scored the winner for York City against Burton Albion from a free kick. He then scored a similar goal from a free kick against Northwich Victoria on 3 October, which was also the match winner. During York's 1–0 defeat to Woking Peat was sent off during a brawl, in which Peat threw several punches. Peat was given a three-match suspension as a result of his red card. In March 2007, Peat was found guilty of violent conduct, and given the punishment of a £200 fine and a two-game ban. He was released by York at the end of the 2006–07 season on 16 May 2007.

Harrogate Town
Peat joined Conference North side Harrogate on 15 June 2007. Harrogate manager Neil Aspin wanted Peat to sign a new contract with the club in February 2009 following interest from Gainsborough Trinity,

Gainsborough Trinity
Peat eventually signed for Gainsborough on 12 March 2009. He agreed a new one-year contract with Gainsborough in May 2010.

North Ferriby United
After being released by Gainsborough following the conclusion of the 2010–11 season, Peat signed for the Northern Premier League Premier Division club North Ferriby United on 28 June 2011. He was a member of the squad that won promotion to the Conference North in 2013 and won the FA Trophy in 2015.

Scarborough Athletic
In the summer of 2015 Peat signed for Scarborough Athletic. In the summer of 2016 he left to join Brigg Town, where he was appointed joint player-manager alongside Anthony Bowsley.

Career statistics

Footnotes

A.  The "League" column constitutes appearances and goals (including those as a substitute) in the Football League, Football Conference and Northern Premier League.
B.  The "Other" column constitutes appearances and goals (including those as a substitute) in the East Riding Senior Cup, FA Trophy, Northern Premier League Challenge Cup and play-offs.

Honours
North Ferriby United
FA Trophy: 2014–15

References

External links

Nathan Peat profile at North Ferriby United A.F.C.

1982 births
Living people
Footballers from Kingston upon Hull
English footballers
Association football fullbacks
Hull City A.F.C. players
Cambridge United F.C. players
Lincoln City F.C. players
York City F.C. players
Harrogate Town A.F.C. players
Gainsborough Trinity F.C. players
North Ferriby United A.F.C. players
English Football League players
National League (English football) players
Northern Premier League players
Scarborough Athletic F.C. players
Brigg Town F.C. players
Bridlington Town A.F.C. players
Barton Town F.C. players
English football managers
Brigg Town F.C. managers